Sunny Hundal (born 1977) is a British journalist, blogger and academic. 

Born in London to Sikh parents of Indian origin, Hundal has a degree in economics from Brunel University. He is best known as the founder and editor of the centre-left group blog Liberal Conspiracy.  The Guardians website named him as their blogger of the year in 2006. Hundal has also written for publications including The Guardian, The Financial Times, New Statesman and The Independent. 

In June 2019, he helped to found a progressive news aggregator, Front Page Live, where he serves as Editorial Director UK. He is also a journalist-in-residence at Kingston University.

Hundal is a Covenor of the cross-party political movement, More United.

Projects 
Hundal has founded and edited a number of politically progressive websites: Liberal Conspiracy, a group weblog about politics and media, Asians in Media, Barfi Culture community websites, the Pickled Politics weblog, and the New Generation Network in 2006, a group and manifesto that attempted to challenge the current discourse on race relations in the UK. All these have been wound up.

In February 2007 he made a BBC radio documentary Lost in Translation about Asian brides brought to the UK. The BBC also quoted his claim that Shahrukh Khan's endorsement of skin-lightening creams was "completely immoral".

In June 2019, he helped to found a progressive news aggregator, Front Page Live, together with Joe Romm, its Editor-in-Chief, Carl Cameron, Laura Dawn, Helen Stickler and others. He serves as Editorial Director UK at Front Page Live.

Political stances 
In 2008, he wrote a blog post saying that non-white voters should consider voting Conservative, on the basis that "brown people" were being deliberately targeted by anti-terrorism legislation brought in by the New Labour government of Gordon Brown. In 2010, on his Liberal Conspiracy blog, he backed the Liberal Democrats in the UK General Election.

About three months after the formation of the Cameron–Clegg coalition, Hundal joined the Labour Party to influence its political direction. In August 2010 Hundal backed Ed Miliband in the Labour leadership election.

Hundal has criticised various religious organisations including the Islamist Hizb ut-Tahrir, the Muslim Council of Britain, Muslim Public Affairs Committee UK, Christian Concern For Our Nation, Sikh Federation and Hindu Forum of Britain.
He has been awarded the Fourth IRDS Awards for Print Media for fighting against religious obscurantism, awarded by the Lucknow-based Institute for Research and Documentation in Social Sciences (IRDS).

In 2014 he defended the Tricycle Theatre's decision to boycott the UK Jewish Film Festival as a result of a £1,400 donation the festival received from the Israeli Embassy.

A vegetarian, he describes himself as a strong environmentalist.

See also 
 List of British Sikhs

References

External links

Liberal Conspiracy
Pickled Politics
Column archives in The Guardian

1977 births
English bloggers
English magazine editors
English people of Indian descent
English Sikhs
Living people
Online journalists
Writers from London
Date of birth missing (living people)
Place of birth missing (living people)
British male bloggers